Mecard may refer to

 MeCard (QR code), a data file in a QR code format, developed by NTT Docomo
 Turning Mecard, a South Korean toyline and media franchise developed for Sonokong by Choirock
 Turning Mecard (TV series), a South Korean animated television series which is a part of the franchise